Julio César Campozano (born 31 January 1986) is a retired Ecuadorian tennis player.

He won seven singles and five doubles Futures titles, and he won doubles title in 2009 Guayaquil Challenger, competing with his compatriot Emilio Gómez. They defeated Andreas Haider-Maurer and Lars Pörschke 6–7(2–7), 6–3, [10–8] in the final.

He is a member of the Ecuador Davis Cup team. His coaches are Alejandro Fabri and Matias Rizzo.

Career titles

Singles (9)

Doubles (8)

Davis Cup

Singles performances (7–9)

Doubles performances (1–3)

References

External links

Ecuadorian male tennis players
Tennis players at the 2011 Pan American Games
Living people
1986 births
Pan American Games silver medalists for Ecuador
Pan American Games medalists in tennis
Medalists at the 2011 Pan American Games
21st-century Ecuadorian people